Gundlachia, commonly called goldenshrub, is a genus of flowering plants in the family Asteraceae.

 Species
 Gundlachia apiculata Britton & S.F.Blake - Cuba
 Gundlachia corymbosa (Urb.) Britton ex Bold. - Bahamas, Greater + Lesser Antilles, Falcón State in Venezuela
 Gundlachia cubana Britton & S.F.Blake - Cuba
 Gundlachia domingensis (Spreng.) A.Gray - Dominican Republic, Cuba, Bahamas
 Gundlachia floribunda Urb. - Cuba
 Gundlachia foliosa Britton & S.F.Blake - Cuba
 Gundlachia lindeniana (A.Rich.) Urb. -  Cuba
 Gundlachia triantha (S.F.Blake) Urbatsch & R.P.Roberts - Chihuahua, Coahuila, Durango, Nuevo León, Texas (Brewster County)
 Gundlachia truncata (G.L.Nesom) Urbatsch & R.P.Roberts - Coahuila

References

Astereae
Asteraceae genera